Rollinia pickelii is a species of plant in the Annonaceae family. It is endemic to Brazil.

References

pickelii
Endemic flora of Brazil
Flora of Paraíba
Flora of Pernambuco
Vulnerable flora of South America
Taxonomy articles created by Polbot
Taxobox binomials not recognized by IUCN